Round Island is an island in the Detroit River in southeast Michigan. It is part of Grosse Ile Township, in Wayne County.

References

Islands of Wayne County, Michigan
Islands of the Detroit River
River islands of Michigan